ARV General Urdaneta (F-23) was the third ship of the Mariscal Sucre-class frigate of the Venezuelan Navy.

Development and design 

Venezuela ordered six Lupo-class frigates from CNR in 1975 as a replacement for older warships. These units were commissioned between 1980 and 1982. In general terms, their appearance and equipment is similar to those built for Peru, except for some differences in electronics and missiles. The other ships in Venezuelan service were expected to undergo an austere version of this upgrade, but three ships were eventually taken out of service.

Construction and career
General Urdaneta was laid down in June 1977 and launched on 22 February 1979 by Cantieri Riuniti dell'Adriatico at Ancona. She was commissioned on 7 March 1981.

Over the years she has participated in multiple important naval exercises and has been the flagship of the multinational UNITAS exercise.

On 1 January 1990, she came alongside USS Hayler during UNITAS 1990.

With the change of name of the Venezuelan naval force, the unit prefix changed from ARV (Armada de la República de Venezuela) to AB (Armada Bolivariana).

She has been drydocked at Puerto Cabello shipyard since 2014.

ARV General Urdaneta completed her operational fleet refit in the 4 Missile Frigates, which already completed the fairing, axles, valves and electrical work in April 2015.

Gallery

References

1979 ships
Lupo-class frigates
Ships built in Italy
Frigates of the Cold War